The 2016 Rugby Europe Sevens Trophy was the second division of Rugby Europe's 2016 sevens season. This edition was hosted by the cities of Malmö and Prague from 11 June to 3 July. The winner, Ireland, was promoted to the 2017 Grand Prix. The two teams with the fewest points, Monaco and Slovenia, were relegated to Conference 1.

Trophy standings

Malmö

Pool stage

Pool A

Pool B

Pool C

Knockout stage
Cup

Plate
{{Round4-with third

|12 June 2016 – 13:15 – Malmö
||17||7
|12 June 2016 – 13:37 –Malmö
||17||14

|12 June 2016 – Malmö
||40||12

|12 June 2016 – Malmö
||0||19
}}BowlPrague

Pool stage

Pool A

Pool B

Pool C

Knockout stageBowlPlateCup'''

References

Trophy
2016 rugby sevens competitions
2016 in Swedish sport
2016 in Czech sport